The Prag Cine Awards North-East 2015 ceremony, presented by the Prag Network, honored the actors, technical achievements, and films censored in 2014 from Assam and rest of Northeast India, and took place on March 21–22, 2015, at the Chowkidingee field in Dibrugarh, Assam. This was the first time when films produced in other Northeastern states were also honored in this ceremony. Assamese actress Nishita Goswami and television host Nabish Alam hosted the show. Film fraternities from Northeast as well as Bollywood personalities such as Neha Dhupia, Gulshan Grover, Adil Hussain were present in this event.

Actor Bishnu Kharghoria was honored with the lifetime Achievement Award for his contribution towards the Assamese film Industry. Arup Baishya received best actor award for Othello and the best actress award has gone to Amrita Gogoi for Ahetuk. Manas Saikia directed North Bank won the best film award, while Anmol Chan, Nepali language film from Sikkim, won the best film north-east award.

Winners and nominees 
In this edition of Prag Cine Awards, awards were given in 22 categories to the Assamese and non-Assamese films produced from Assam and in another 4 categories to the films produced from rest of northeast India and censored in the year of 2014. Ahetuk topped the nomination list with fifteen nominations, followed by North Bank and Othello with twelve and eleven nominations respectively.

Awards for films from Assam 
Winners are listed first and highlighted in boldface.

Awards for films from rest of northeast India 
Winners are listed first and highlighted in boldface.

Lifetime achievement award
Actor Bishnu Kharghoria was honored with the lifetime Achievement Award for his contribution towards the Assamese film Industry.

Other awards 
 Best Writing on Cinema: Dr. Subratjyoti Neog
 Jury's Special Mention: Shabnam Borgoyari – Aarohi

See also 
List of Assamese films of the 2010s

References

Cinema of Assam
2014 film awards